The Movimento Comunista d'Italia (MCd'I), best-known after its newspaper Bandiera Rossa, was a revolutionary partisan brigade, and the largest single formation of the 1943-44 Italian Resistance in Rome.

History
Growing out of communist underground circles like Scintilla that sought to recreate the Communist Party of Italy crushed in 1926, the MCd'I would clash with other anti-fascist forces, including Palmiro Togliatti's Moscow-backed Partito Comunista Italiano, over the correct attitude to take to the partisan struggle.

The MCd'I, which suffered some 186 deaths among its close to three-thousand members under Wehrmacht occupation, advocated 'turning the war between nations into a war between classes' in 'the struggle to create a Soviet republic on Italian soil', but it would be banned by the Western Allies soon after Liberation.. Its leaders included lifelong communist militant Tigrino Sabatini (executed 3 May 1944), Raffaele de Luca, Antonino Poce, Felice Chilanti and Guido Piovene.

References

Italian resistance movement
Anti-fascist organisations in Italy